Canterbury-Bankstown is a customary region of Sydney, Australia, in the south-western suburbs. The area is located to the north of the St George region (from which it is separated by Wolli Creek) and to the south of the Inner West region (from which it is separated by the Cooks River). The Bankstown railway line serves many of the suburbs in this region. The suburbs of the Canterbury-Bankstown region are not specific to the local government area of the City of Canterbury-Bankstown, but includes many of them. The region lies on the eastern reaches of the Cumberland Plain.

Boundaries
The Canterbury-Bankstown region is customary, not legally or administratively defined, and its boundaries with surrounding customary regions vary from context to context. In the east, the region is generally viewed as including the part of the Parish of St George that lies north of Wolli Creek, which was formerly governed by the City of Canterbury. In this area, the regional boundaries are geographical and thus relatively well defined: Wolli Creek acts as the southern boundary of this region (separating it from the St George region) and the Cooks River the northern boundary (separating it from the Inner West region). Immediately to the west of the Parish of St George, separated by Salt Pan Creek, is the Parish of Bankstown, which was formerly largely governed by the City of Bankstown. The Parish of Bankstown is generally also seen as forming part of the Canterbury-Bankstown region. In this part, the Georges River acts as the geographical southern boundary of this region, and the upper reaches of the Georges River together with Prospect Creek act as the western boundary. The northern boundary is not natural and thus less well defined: the Hume Highway separates the Parish of Bankstown (south) from the Parish of Liberty Plains (north), but the whole of the suburbs that straddle the Hume Highway (such as Yagoona or Bass Hill) are usually seen as part of the Canterbury-Bankstown region.

History
The original inhabitants of Canterbury and Bankstown were the Gweagal, Bidjigal, (also known as Bediagal) and a small portion of the Dharug people.

Five years after the First Fleet arrived in Sydney Cove in 1788, a man by the name of Rev Richard Johnson, a chaplain aboard the First Fleet, was the first to receive a land grant of 40 hectares in what is now known as the 'Canterbury-Bankstown region'. The land was located in the Ashbury-Hurlstone Park area. He named his estate 'Canterbury Vale', presumably after the See of Canterbury in England. The date of the grant was May 1793 although he (Johnson) occupied the land months earlier. Johnson also cultivated land around his cottage in Bridge St Sydney and at another location called the Brickfield  near Central Station. Johnson was praised by Watkin Tench as being one of the best farmers in the colony. 

The first ambulance to service the area was in 1908. It was called the 'Canterbury District Ambulance Corps' and it used volunteers to transport patients to the hospital. A stretcher on wheels with a hooded cover over it (hand litter) was used to transport patients to the Western Suburbs Hospital. If a patient lived in an area around Belmore, the hand litter was transported by train from Campsie to Belmore, then it was pushed along the rough unsealed roads to the patients home, back to Belmore station, then taken by train to Campsie Station and along the streets to hospital.

The Canterbury District Memorial Hospital commenced business on 26 October 1929. The hospital was opened by Secretary for Public Works Buttenshaw. Prior to the opening of the hospital [in Canterbury], residents attended the Western Suburbs Hospital or the cottage hospital located in Marrickville, which was established in 1895.

In 1940, the events of World War II were made known to the residents of Canterbury-Bankstown. Men and women who were drafted had to report for duty at a drill hall located on Canterbury Road Belmore. Camps were set up in Canterbury Race Course and surrounding parks in the region. In that same year thousands of Australian troops travelled along the goods line to Darling Harbour, ready to embark for the Middle East.

In 1940 the department of Civil Aviation purchased 250 hectares of land in Bankstown for the construction of Bankstown Airport and an RAAF Station was formed. The facility was a secondary airport to Mascot Airport. In 1942 a command bunker (Sydney Air Defence Headquarters) of semi underground construction was established on the corner of Edgar and Marion Street Bankstown. The bunker was manned by No. 1 Fighter Sector RAAF, members of the No.2 Volunteer Air Observer Corps, the WAAAF's, the RAAF and the United States Army Air Forces. The primary use of the Sydney Air Defence Headquarters was the location, tracking and interception of all planes in the eastern area of the South West Pacific.

In 1941, WAAAF's were posted to Bankstown. The women were trained as clerks, wireless telegraphists, mess orderlies, drill instructors and drivers,  a portion of these women were assigned to work in the command centre (Bankstown Bunker) located on Black Charlies Hill. In 1942, Belmore House, the current sight of today's Roselands Shopping Centre was used by the Australian Army for the training of troops. Tents on the property were used to house an infantry battalion and an ambulance corps. The site was vacated after a year. Units of the US Air Force were based in Bankstown after 1942, earning the suburb the nickname 'Yankstown'. Also in 1942 a military hospital was established for the U.S. Army at Herne Bay, now known as Riverwood. It was the largest military hospital in Australia during World War II. Known as the 118 General Hospital  it consisted of 490 timber barracks-type buildings, which could house a total of 4,250 beds and accommodate up to 1,250 patients and 3,500 staff.

Within the same year 16 US fighter planes that were based at Bankstown airport flew over Canterbury racecourse at low altitude during a race meet. This was to let the Australian public, especially those of the district to know that they, their allies were there for their protection. Regardless of these events, punters were annoyed at the disruption caused.

From 1944 to 1945, a Volunteer Air Observer Corps operated in Bankstown. These volunteers were both male and female, were of 15 to 60 years of age and were given several weeks training. There were over 300 volunteers who worked in shifts that the air force called 'flights' 24 hours a day, seven days a week. This freed RAAF personnel for other duties. In 1945 Bankstown Airport was occupied by the British Fleet Air Arm, known as HMS Nabberley, and the RAAF by 1946.

Economy
Multinational companies such as Volkswagen and Cosentino have based Australian operations in the region. There is also major investment by local and foreign companies in the aviation, Print media and retail.

Residents

The Canterbury-Bankstown region is characterised by high-density housing towards the east and larger family homes towards the west with large natural parklands toward the south, such as those around Salt Pan Creek. Suburbs within the region have a multicultural nature.

Young families and couples are opting to live in the Canterbury-Bankstown region as a cheaper alternative to living in Sydney's Inner West, whilst at the same time residents of the region are suffering heavily from mortgage repossession which is forcing poorer families to move into Sydney's Outer Western Suburbs.

Like Sydney's inner west, Canterbury-Bankstown is multi-cultural. There is a significant Chinese, Indian, Korean, Fijian, Vietnamese, Lebanese, Greek, Italian, Yugoslav and African population. This is also reflected in the variety and style of many local businesses and cultural institutions.

Notable former residents include the former Prime Minister John Howard and Paul Keating and Olympian Ian Thorpe.

The Australian Bureau of Statistics defines two statistical areas (SAL3) called "Canterbury" and "Bankstown" respectively, which together largely correlate with the customary definitions of the Canterbury-Bankstown region. Based on the 2021 Australian census:
 SAL3 "Canterbury" had a population of 141,091, with a median age of 36. 25.3% of people had a highest educational qualification of bachelor or above, compared to 27.8% across the state. The largest population groups by ancestry were Chinese (13.6%), Lebanese (11.8%), Australian (11.0%), Greek (9.6%) and English (8.9%). 44.2% of people were born in Australia, and the next most popular places of birth were China (7.0%), Lebanon (4.9%), Bangladesh (3.7%), Vietnam (3.3%) and Greece (3.3%). The most popular responses for religion were Islam (22.6%), Catholic (21.0%), no religion (17.8%), Eastern Orthodox (11.7%) and not stated (8.1%). 29.1% of people spoke only English at home, and the next popular responses for languages used at home were Arabic (13.2%), Greek (7.8%), Mandarin (6.8%), Bengali (4.7%) and Cantonese (4.2%).
 SAL3 "Bankstown" had a population of 186,245, with a median age of 36. 21.7% of people had a highest educational qualification of bachelor or above, compared to 27.8% across the state. The largest population groups by ancestry were Lebanese (16.8%), Australian (16.0%), English (12.8%), Vietnamese (9.7%) and Chinese (8.6%). 53.4% of people were born in Australia, and the next most popular places of birth were Vietnam (7.7%), Lebanon (6.7%), China (3.3%), Pakistan (1.3%) and India (1.3%). The most popular responses for religion were Islam (25.6%), Catholic (22.2%), no religion (15.3%), not stated (7.7%) and Eastern Orthodox (6.9%). 36.7% of people spoke only English at home, and the next popular responses for languages used at home were Arabic (21.2%), Vietnamese (10.1%), Mandarin (3.3%),  Greek (2.8%) and Cantonese (2.7%).

Suburbs
The Canterbury-Bankstown region is not an exact area, although the following suburbs are usually agreed to be a part of the region:

 Bankstown
 Bass Hill
 Belmore 
 Beverly Hills (partially)
 Birrong
 Campsie
 Canterbury

 Chester Hill
 Chullora
 Clemton Park
 Condell Park
 Earlwood
 East Hills
 Georges Hall

 Greenacre
 Kingsgrove (partially)
 Lakemba
 Lansdowne
 Leightonfield
 Milperra

 Mount Lewis
 Narwee (partially)
 Padstow
 Padstow Heights
 Panania
 Picnic Point
 Potts Hill

 Punchbowl
 Regents Park
 Revesby
 Revesby Heights
 Riverwood (partially)
 Roselands
 Sefton

 Villawood
 Wiley Park
 Yagoona

Commercial areas

The biggest commercial areas in the Canterbury-Bankstown area are located at Bankstown, Campsie and Roselands. Bankstown is the largest central business district in the region and features a large shopping centre called Bankstown Central. Roselands also features a large shopping centre called Roselands Shopping Centre. The Canterbury-Bankstown region also has a variety of Vietnamese, Lebanese, Greek, Italian, Spanish, African and Australian restaurants, delicatessens, sweet shops, grocery and fresh food markets.

Transport
Canterbury, Liverpool and Punchbowl Roads are the main roads through the area. The M5 Motorway runs through the Bankstown are and close to the southern boundary of the Canterbury area, and provides a motorway connection from this region east to Sydney Airport and west to Liverpool and beyond and (via the M8 Motorway and WestConnex) the Inner West region and beyond.

Public transport in the region includes trains and buses. Sydney Trains's Bankstown Line runs from the City Circle to Liverpool or Lidcombe via Campsie and Bankstown. The Airport & South Line also runs from the City Circle and follows a more southerly route, with all stations services that terminate at Revesby and limited stops services which continue onto Macarthur. This line also provides a direct connection from the region to Sydney Airport. There are various bus routes provided largely by the privately owned companies Transit Systems, Punchbowl Bus Company and Transdev NSW.

Education
The Canterbury-Bankstown area houses the Bankstown Campus of the Western Sydney University.

Organisations
 The Canterbury-Bankstown Rugby League Football Club
 Sydney Olympic Football Club
 Canterbury-Bankstown Express, local newspaper 
 Canterbury-Bankstown Migrant Resource Centre

Government

Parliamentary representation
The federal divisions of Barton, Banks, Blaxland, Grayndler and Watson are located within part or all of the region of Canterbury-Bankstown. The state electoral districts of Bankstown, Canterbury, East Hills and Lakemba are located within part or all of the region. It is a relatively safe region for the Labor party.

Local government
The region is covered by the City of Canterbury-Bankstown, a local government authority.

Health
The former City of Canterbury is served by the Sydney Local Health District of NSW Health, which also covers the Inner West region. Canterbury Hospital, a historic public hospital operated by the Sydney Local Health District is in the region.

The former City of Bankstown is served by the South Western Sydney Health District of NSW Health, which also covers an expansive area to the south and west of Sydney as far south as the Southern Highlands.

References

Regions of Sydney
Military history of Sydney during World War II